Hermann Clemenz (23 January 1846 – 28 March 1908) was an Estonian chess master.

Biography
Born in Dorpat (Tartu), Estonia (then Russian Empire), he began his chess career in his native town, then lived in St. Petersburg, where he participated in several tournaments.  In Dorpat, he won some games against Eisenschmidt in the 1860s.  In St. Petersburg he took 4th in 1876 (Andreas Ascharin won), took 4th in 1877 (Mikhail Chigorin won), and took 3rd, behind Sergey Lebedev and Grigory Helbach, in 1901.

Legacy

His name is attached to the Clemenz Opening; 1.h3.  He played this opening in St. Petersburg in 1873.

References

1846 births
1908 deaths
Sportspeople from Tartu
People from Kreis Dorpat
Baltic-German people
Estonian chess players
19th-century chess players